Franklin Elmore Kennamer (January 12, 1879 – May 1, 1960) was a justice of the Oklahoma Supreme Court and a United States district judge of the United States District Court for the Eastern District of Oklahoma and the United States District Court for the Northern District of Oklahoma.

Education and career

Born to Seaborn F. Kennamer (1830 – 1915) and his wife, Nancy Elizabeth Mitchell Kennamer (1848 – 1898) on January 12, 1879, in Kennamer Cove, Marshall County, Alabama, Kennamer read law in 1905. He was a Colonel in the United States Army during the Spanish–American War. He was the city attorney of Madill, Oklahoma from 1915 to 1916. He was the Mayor of Madill from 1919 to 1920. He was a justice of the Oklahoma Supreme Court from 1920 to 1924.

Federal judicial service

Kennamer was nominated by President Calvin Coolidge on January 28, 1924, to the United States District Court for the Eastern District of Oklahoma, to a new seat authorized by 42 Stat. 837. He was confirmed by the United States Senate on February 19, 1924, and received his commission the same day. Kennamer was reassigned by operation of law to the United States District Court for the Northern District of Oklahoma on February 16, 1925, to a new seat authorized by 43 Stat. 945. He assumed senior status due to a certified disability on June 1, 1940. His service terminated on May 1, 1960, due to his death. He was interred in Chelsea Cemetery in Chelsea, Oklahoma.

References

Sources
 

1879 births
1960 deaths
People from Marshall County, Alabama
Justices of the Oklahoma Supreme Court
Judges of the United States District Court for the Eastern District of Oklahoma
Judges of the United States District Court for the Northern District of Oklahoma
United States district court judges appointed by Calvin Coolidge
20th-century American judges
United States Army officers
Mayors of places in Oklahoma
United States federal judges admitted to the practice of law by reading law